Abhay Singh may refer to:
 Abhay Singh (squash player)
 Abhay Singh (politician)